This is a list of the largest urban areas in the world by area.

Urban areas 
This table shows all cities or conurbations with a total urbanised area of at least 5,000 km2, according to Demographia's annual World Urban Areas publication, that uses a consistent methodology between countries to provide comparable population and area figures.

See also 

 List of largest cities
 List of United States cities by area

References 

 

Urban geography
Cities-related lists of superlatives
cities
cities